Donald's Double Trouble is a 1946 Donald Duck short film released by RKO Radio Pictures, colored by Technicolor and produced by Walt Disney Productions. This cartoon marks the fourth appearance of Daisy Duck.

This cartoon also features the first appearance of Donald's doppelganger, who was unnamed in this short. However, years later he reappeared in Legend of the Three Caballeros, where has been named and since known as "Dapper Duck".

This short is notable for featuring a short-tempered Daisy Duck. At the end of the short, Daisy displays a dangerous temper, which is ironic considering that she criticised Donald for his short temper beforehand.

Plot
Donald is inside a telephone booth in a telephone call with Daisy, who scolds him for a lack of manners along with his poor use of the English language and threatens to end their relationship if Donald doesn't improve his personality after which she slams the phone down so hard it causes the telephone booth to literally explode.

Fearing that he will lose Daisy, Donald wanders through the streets to figure out a solution when he meets a nameless look-alike British-accented duck with a more pleasant voice and temper than him, whom he offers money to impersonate him in order to win back Daisy.

The plan goes awry when the look-alike starts falling for Daisy, who is calling him Donald since he looks a lot like him, which incurs Donald's wrath and jealousy, despite the look-alike assuring Donald everything is working in his favor. For the rest of the date, Donald tries everything to prevent them from getting closer and win back Daisy himself.

Donald follows them to an amusement park, where he tries several attempts to stop Daisy from falling for the look-alike, but fails at every turn. The final attempt is at the Tunnel of Love, where he begs the look-alike to stop  but is pushed underwater. Donald, now soaked and infuriated, storms into the tunnel and a massive and brutal fight ensues offscreen.

The camera then zooms to the exit of the tunnel, where it shows Donald and the look-alike holding hands and closing eyes romantically, exiting the tunnel, mistaking each other for Daisy. Both become shocked upon seeing each other and then look back to see Daisy walking out of the tunnel, completely drenched and angrily ranting at them incoherently. Realizing he got the wrong duck, Donald and his look-alike quickly run away as Daisy continues to yell at them.

Voice cast
 Clarence Nash as Donald Duck
 Gloria Blondell as Daisy Duck
 Leslie Denison as Donald-Duck-look-alike

Home media
The short was released on December 6, 2005 on Walt Disney Treasures: The Chronological Donald, Volume Two: 1942-1946.

Additional releases include:
Best Pals: Donald and Daisy DVD
The Parent Trap 2001 DVD

References

External links
 https://www.bcdb.com/cartoon/4151-Donalds-Double-Trouble
 
 Donald's Double Trouble

1946 animated films
1946 short films
1940s English-language films
Donald Duck short films
1940s Disney animated short films
Films directed by Jack King
Films produced by Walt Disney
American animated short films
RKO Pictures short films
RKO Pictures animated short films
Films about ducks
Films scored by Oliver Wallace